Rafael Arcaute, known as Rafa Arcaute, is an Argentine songwriter, record producer and recording engineer. He has worked with several Latin American artists including Luis Alberto Spinetta, Illya Kuryaki & The Valderramas, Calle 13, Aterciopelados, Diego Torres, Babasónicos and Andrés Calamaro. He has received eleven Latin Grammy Awards, including two wins for Producer of the Year in 2011 and 2016, he has also won the Grammy Award for Best Latin Rock, Alternative or Urban Album as a producer for Calle 13's Los de Atrás Vienen Conmigo at the 52nd Annual Grammy Awards.

Career
Arcaute studied at the Escuela Superior de Comercio Carlos Pellegrini in Buenos Aires, Argentina and later studied a Degree in Electroacoustic Composition at the Universidad Nacional de Quilmes.

He began working at 23 years old as a touring member of Luis Alberto Spinetta's band Spinetta and as keyboardist and engineer for several of Spinetta's albums including Argentina Sorgo Films Presenta: Spinetta Obras (2002), Para los Árboles (2003) and Camalotus (2004). He then worked in the production of two albums by Puerto Rican band Calle 13, Los de Atrás Vienen Conmigo (2008) and Entren Los Que Quieran (2010).

Arcaute produced two albums by Argentine singer Diego Torres, Distinto (2010) and Buena Vida (2015). In 2011, he worked in Babasónicos's tenth album A Propósito. In 2016, he served as manager for Illya Kuryaki & The Valderramas's tour L.H.O.N. Tour after working in the production of their 2012 album Chances, he also produced Colombian band Aterciopelados's first live album Reluciente, Rechinante y Aterciopelado the same year.

Since 2018, he resides in Miami, United States and works as a part of Sony Music alongside Afo Verde. After working in some of her previous singles, Arcaute produced Argentine singer Nathy Peluso's debut album Calambre, released in 2020, he also worked in Spanish singer C. Tangana's El Madrileño, which was released in 2021.

Discography

(A) Album, (S), Single

Awards and nominations

Grammy Awards

Gardel Awards

Latin Grammy Awards

References

Latin Grammy Award winners
Latin music record producers
Living people
Year of birth missing (living people)
Latin music songwriters